Eskander is a surname. Notable people with the surname include:

Alan Eskander (born 1975), Australian entrepreneur and licensed bookmaker 
Saad Eskander (born 1962), Iraqi Kurdish academic and researcher